Alexander Dmitriyevich Dolgov (born 1 July 1941) is a Russian physicist and a professor at Novosibirsk State University and the University of Ferrara who is known for his contribution in cosmology and astroparticle physics.

Public position 
In February 2022, he signed an open letter by Russian scientists condemning the 2022 Russian invasion of Ukraine.

Awards
 Lenin Komsomol Prize, 1973.
 Landau-Weizmann in Theoretical Physics (Weizmann Institute of Science), 1996
 Bruno Pontecorvo Prize (JINR, Dubna, Russia), 2009
 Friedmann Prize (Russian Academy of Sciences), 2011
 Markov Prize in 2014
 Member of the International Society on General Relativity and Gravitation.
 Member of the Assembly of Experts INTAS (until 2008).

Books
 Basics of modern cosmology 
 Introduction to Particle Cosmology: The Standard Model of Cosmology and its Open Problems

References

External links 
 SASHA'S FEST, in honour of Prof. Alexander (Sasha) Dolgov at The Department of Physics of University of Ferrara
 publication list at INSPIRE-HEP
 Laboratory of Nuclear Problems of JINR

1941 births
Living people
Moscow Institute of Physics and Technology alumni
Academic staff of Novosibirsk State University
Academic staff of the University of Ferrara
Recipients of the Lenin Komsomol Prize
Russian physicists
Soviet physicists
Russian activists against the 2022 Russian invasion of Ukraine